Megan Renee Betsa (born March 7, 1995) is an American, former collegiate All-American, right-handed professional softball pitcher and coach. She is a former assistant coach at Chattanooga. She played college softball for Michigan in the Big Ten Conference, where she is the career strikeout ratio (10.7) leader for both the Big Ten and Michigan, and also ranks top-20 for the NCAA Division I. Betsa was selected seventh overall by the Akron Racers in the 2017 NPF Draft, and went on to play professionally for the now defunct Racers.

Early life
Betsa grew up in McDonough, Georgia. Her father, Howard Betsa, played college basketball for the Tennessee Volunteers men's basketball program.  Betsa attended Union Grove High School where she was selected as an all-state softball player all four years.  She was also named the Georgia player and pitcher of the year in both 2011 and 2012. In 2013, she was named the Gatorade Softball Player of the Year.

College career
Betsa enrolled at the University of Michigan in the fall of 2013. As a freshman during the 2014 college softball season, she compiled an 18–4 record with a 2.15 earned run average and 150 strikeouts.

In 2015, Betsa appeared in 46 games, 38 as a starter, and earned a 31–5 record with a 1.72 ERA and 333 strikeouts in  innings pitched. She received multiple honors during the 2015 season, including the following:

 On April 21, she was named National Pitcher of the Week after pitching three complete games, including a no-hitter.
 She was selected to the 2015 All-Big Ten Conference team and named the Big Ten pitcher of the Year.

In the 2016 season——Betsa has appeared in 32 games, 23 as a starter, recording a 22–3 win–loss record with a 2.05 ERA and 236 strikeouts. In the first two games of the NCAA regional, she gave up only two runs. She threw a shutout victory against LSU in the Women's College World Series on June 3, 2016.

As a senior in 2017, Betsa earned first-team All-Big Ten and second-team NFCA All-America honors after reaching career bests in ERA (1.48), shutouts (12), strikeouts (412), and opposing batting average (.148). Betsa graduated from Michigan in April 2017 with a B.A. in sport management.

Professional playing career
Betsa was the seventh overall selection in the 2017 NPF Draft, selected by the Akron Racers on April 24, 2017. On May 30, 2017, Betsa signed a three-year contract with the Racers. NPF named Betsa Rookie of the Week for the week of June 19 to 25, 2017, following her first pro complete game with a career high nine strikeouts in a 2-1 win over the Beijing Shougang Eagles on June 22.

Coaching career
On August 25, 2017, Betsa joined Paula Congleton's inaugural coaching staff with University of New Mexico softball as pitching coach.

On August 20, 2018, Betsa became the pitching coach at Chattanooga under Frank Reed.

Statistics

Michigan Wolverines

References

External links
 
 

1995 births
Living people
Akron Racers players
Michigan Wolverines softball players
Chattanooga Mocs softball coaches
New Mexico Lobos softball coaches
People from McDonough, Georgia
Softball players from Georgia (U.S. state)
Female sports coaches
American softball coaches